Elaine Koon (born c. 1993) is a rhythmic gymnast known for being the first gymnast to ever win an individual rhythmic gymnastics gold medal for Malaysia in the 2010 Commonwealth Games.

Koon also claimed a silver and three bronze medals and her efforts earned her RM180,000 in cash reward from the National Sports Council (NSC). However, her relationship with national chief coach Elena Kholodova then turned sour following claims of Kholodova demanding a portion of Koon’s cash reward forcing Koon to resign from gymnastics.

References

Living people
People from Selangor
Malaysian people of Chinese descent
Malaysian rhythmic gymnasts
Commonwealth Games gold medallists for Malaysia
Commonwealth Games silver medallists for Malaysia
Commonwealth Games bronze medallists for Malaysia
Gymnasts at the 2010 Commonwealth Games
Gymnasts at the 2010 Asian Games
Commonwealth Games medallists in gymnastics
1993 births
Asian Games competitors for Malaysia
Medallists at the 2010 Commonwealth Games